Kelen Sadie Coleman (born April 19, 1984) is an American actress.

Early life
Coleman grew up in Potomac, Maryland and graduated from University of North Carolina at Chapel Hill. Her father is bluegrass musician T. Michael Coleman. Her mother is Jewish, her father is Christian.

Filmography

Film

Television

References

External links

1984 births
Actresses from Maryland
American film actresses
American television actresses
Living people
People from Potomac, Maryland
University of North Carolina at Chapel Hill alumni
21st-century American actresses
Actresses from Nashville, Tennessee